Jemyca Aribado (born 21 September 1993 in Taguig) is a Filipino professional squash player. As of February 2018, she was ranked number 83 in the world. By August 2017, she became the first Filipino player to break into the top 100 after she rose to rank 98.

Career
Aribado's first experience with squash was when she was 5 years old. It was at age 12 or 13 when she decided to focus on the sport.

One of the three bronze medals of the Philippines at the 2015 Southeast Asian Games was won by Aribado.

At the 2016 South East Asian Cup Squash Championship in Myanmar, Aribado along with Yvonne Dalida secured the country's sole gold medal in the tournament by winning the women's jumbo double. She herself won a bronze in the individual event. At the 2017 Southeast Asian Games, she and Dalida settled for silver at the women's jumbo double. She won a bronze in the women's single while helped in winning three other bronze medals.

She made her debut in the Professional Squash Association (PSA) Tour in September 2016. at the PSA China Challenge Cup. She cited political issues with the national association and funding as factors that hindered her from joining the tour.

References

1993 births
Living people
Filipino female squash players
People from Taguig
Asian Games competitors for the Philippines
Squash players at the 2010 Asian Games
Squash players at the 2018 Asian Games
Southeast Asian Games medalists in squash
Southeast Asian Games gold medalists for the Philippines
Southeast Asian Games competitors for the Philippines
Southeast Asian Games silver medalists for the Philippines
Southeast Asian Games bronze medalists for the Philippines
Competitors at the 2015 Southeast Asian Games
Competitors at the 2017 Southeast Asian Games
Competitors at the 2019 Southeast Asian Games